Harpalus karamani is a species of ground beetle in the subfamily Harpalinae. It was described by Apfelbeck in 1902.

References

karamani
Beetles described in 1902